This is list of members of the Argentine Chamber of Deputies from 10 December 2003 to 9 December 2005.

Composition

By province

By political groups
as of 9 December 2005

Election cycles

List of deputies

Notes

References

External links
List of deputies in the official website (archived)

2003
2003 in Argentina
2004 in Argentina
2005 in Argentina